Belaid is both a surname and a given name. Notable people with the name include:

Surname 
Chokri Belaid (1964–2013), Tunisian lawyer and politician
Khaled Belaid (born 1987), Tunisian volleyball player
Tijani Belaid, France born Tunisian footballer

Given name 
Belaid Abdessalam, Algerian politician
Belaïd Abrika, Algerian academic
Belaid Lacarne, Algerian football referee

Surnames of Arabic origin